Naomi Broady and Sara Sorribes Tormo were the defending champions, but Broady chose not to participate and Sorribes Tormo chose to compete in Charleston instead.

Asia Muhammad and Maria Sanchez won the title, defeating Monique Adamczak and Jessica Moore in the final, 7–6(7–2), 6–4.

Seeds

Draw

Draw

References
 Main Draw

Monterrey Open - Doubles
2019 Doubles